Les chansons en or (meaning The Golden Songs) is the second French-language greatest hits album by Canadian singer Celine Dion, released in Quebec, Canada on 22 April 1986. It includes hits from her previous studio albums and one new song, "Fais ce que tu voudras".

Background and content
Dion was very hardworking during the past five years. She had recorded nine albums for the Canadian market (five regular releases, two Christmas albums, one live recording, and one greatest hits). She had also released two compilations in France. Dion got Gold and Platinum certifications for her albums and singles and received eleven Félix Awards and two Yamaha Music Festival Awards. It was about time to sum up those achievements and that's how Les chansons en or was born.

It was promoted by the new song "Fais ce que tu voudras", which reached number thirty-six on the Quebec chart. According to René Grignon, the composer, an English version of the song (titled Stay) was recorded but never released.

Dion did her first French music video for that single. Her first commercial video ever was for an English song "Listen to the Magic Man" in 1985. It was Dion's first movie song as well as her first English song recorded in the studio. This greatest hits album was Dion's first album released on a CD. The music video for "Fais ce que tu voudras" was nominated for the Félix Award for Video of the Year.

Commercial performance
The album reached number fifteen in Quebec.

Track listing

Charts

Release history

References

External links
 

1986 greatest hits albums
Albums produced by Eddy Marnay
Celine Dion compilation albums